"Rubber Bullets" is a song by the English band 10cc from their self-titled debut album.  The song was written by Lol Creme, Kevin Godley, and Graham Gouldman and produced by 10cc.

Recording and impact
The song features a double-speed guitar solo, guitarist Eric Stewart explained:

Stewart also recalled: 

Bassist Graham Gouldman remembered:

Although the song was not banned by the BBC at the time of release, it was later banned for the duration of the Gulf War in 1990 and 1991.

Chart performance
"Rubber Bullets" was the band's first number one single in the UK Singles Chart, spending one week at the top in June 1973. It also reached No. 1 in Ireland and No. 3 in Australia, but it fared relatively poorly in the United States where it peaked at only No. 73, and in Canada (their first appearance) where it reached just No. 76. The single achieved sales of over 50,000 copies in Australia, being eligible for the award of a Gold Disc.

In popular culture
"Rubber Bullets" was used as the theme song to the pilot episode of American animated TV series Superjail!, which aired in May 2007.
The song was featured on the soundtrack of the 1998 film A Soldier's Daughter Never Cries.

References

UK Singles Chart number-one singles
Irish Singles Chart number-one singles
1973 songs
10cc songs
Songs written by Graham Gouldman
Songs written by Kevin Godley
Songs written by Lol Creme
Songs about prison
UK Records singles